Sapsford is a surname. Notable people with the surname include:

Danny Sapsford (born 1969), English tennis player
George Sapsford (1896–1970), English footballer
Paul Sapsford (1949–2009), New Zealand rugby player
Roland Sapsford, New Zealand politician
Tom Sapsford (born 1975), British ballet dancer and choreographer